The Lairdland Farm House is a historic farmhouse in Giles County, Tennessee, U.S..

History
The land belonged to Thomas J. Lane when it was purchased by Robert Henderson Laird in the 1830. Shortly after, Laird built the farmhouse, and he designed it in the Greek Revival architectural style. During the American Civil War of 1861–1865, it served as a hospital for the Confederate States Army.

In 1867, it was passed on to Laird's daughter and her husband, James Knox Polk Blackburn. It was subsequently inherited by their son, Dr. James K. P. Blackburn. By the 1990s, the house belonged to James T. Blackburn IV. In 2002, it was purchased by Donald Rouleau.

The house has been listed on the National Register of Historic Places since September 7, 1995. It has a Civil War museum open to the public.

References

External links
 Lairdland Farm House - official site

Houses on the National Register of Historic Places in Tennessee
Greek Revival houses in Tennessee
Houses completed in 1830
Houses in Giles County, Tennessee
Antebellum architecture
American Civil War museums in Tennessee
Historic house museums in Tennessee